Reverend Martin Jerome Scott, S.J., Litt. D. (1865-1954) was an American priest of the Society of Jesus of the Roman Catholic Church and author of a number of books, pamphlets, and articles.

Life
From 1902 to 1915, Fr. Scott was associated with the Church of St. Ignatius Loyola (New York City) in Yorkville, Manhattan; being in charge of the Altar Boys and the Boy's Choir. In 1905, he took charge of the supervision of the Young Ladies Sodality. In 1910, he directed the construction of a Day Nursery and facilitated the organization of the Ladies Auxiliary Society.

Selected works
God and myself: an inquiry into the true religion (1917)	
The Hand of God: A Theology for the People (1918)
Convent life: the meaning of a religious vocation (1920)
Credentials of Christianity (1920)
You and Yours: Practical Talks on Your Home Life (1921)
A Boy Knight (1921)
Mother Machree: A Novel (1922)
The Divine Counsellor (1922)
What ails the world (article - North American Review, September 1922)
You and Yours: Practical Talks on Home Life (1923 2nd edition of 1921 book)
Man (1923)
For Better for Worse: A Novel (1923)
Christ or Chaos (1924)
Kelly: A Novel (1924)
The Virgin Birth (1925)
Evolution (1925)
Catholics and the Ku Klux Klan (article - North American Review, Summer 1926)
Religion and Common Sense (1926)
Isaac Jogues: missioner and martyr : an adaptation of the original biography of Martin-Shea (1927)
Things Catholics Are Asked About (1927)
Father Scott's radio talks, 1927–1928, station WLWL (1928)
The Holy Sacrifice of the Mass (1928)
Upstream (1929) Novel
Christs Own Church (1930)
Christ, True God (1930)
Marriage (1930 and 1941)
The Altar Boys of St. John's (1931) Novel
Happiness (1931)
What Use is Faith (1932)
Faith and Conduct (1932)
why Catholics Believe (1932)
Religious Certainty (1933)
The Church and the World (1934)
Courtship and Marriage (1934)
The Glories of the Catholic Church (with E.T. O'Dwyer, 1935)
Marriage Problems (1935)
What is Heaven (1936)
Catholic Pamphlets (1938)
Answer Wisely (1938)
Teacher's Manual for Answer Wisely (1938)
Introduction to Catholicism (1939)
Jesus as men saw him (1940)
Hundreds of Churches: But Only One is Christ's (1941)
No Pope Can be Wrong in Teaching Doctrine (1941)
Science Helps the Church: The Church Favors Science (pamphlet, 1941)
They Said He Blasphemed, He Said He was the Son of God: What Say You of Jesus Christ? (pamphlet, 1941)
This is my Body: the Sacrifice of the Mass (1941)
Prove There's a Soul that Will Live Forever (pamphlet, 1941)
God Forgives Sins: Why Confess to a Priest (pamphlet, 1942)
Divorce is a Disease which Destroys Marriage (pamphlet, 1944)
The Soul of Man (1945)
Have You a God?: What is He Like (1945)
Only One Church, Christ's Church (1945)
The Infallible Pope (1945)
This is My Body (1945)
He Said He was the Son of God (1945)
The Church the Champion of Science (1946)
All you who are burdened (1946)
Matthew, Mark, Luke and John - Were They Fooled, Did They Lie? (1946)
Catholicism: Preserver of Christianity (pamphlet, 1950)
The Life Work of the Nuns of the Good Shepherd (1900)

External links
 Google Books: author Martin J. Scott
  WorldCat.org http://www.worldcat.org/search?q=au%3AScott%2C+Martin+J.&qt=hot_author

References

19th-century American Jesuits
20th-century American Jesuits
1865 births
1954 deaths